Chloritis minahassae is a species of air-breathing land snail, a terrestrial pulmonate gastropod mollusk in the family Camaenidae.

Distribution 

The type locality is the peak of the Sudara volcano, Northern Sulawesi; in German language: "Nord Celebes, Gipfel des Vulkans Sudara; Vulkan Lokon; Bone Gebirge".

New records by Maassen (2009) are from northern Sulawesi: Tangkoko Nature Reserve, moss forest at Sudara Vulcano; east Shore Lake Tondok, 12.5 km east of Kotamobagu, 00°43.44’N 124°26.40’E.

Shell description 
The shell is small for the genus, brown, with hairs, with impressed spire, umbilicated, the ends of the peristome connected with a thin callus. The width of the shell is 11–13 mm.

References
This article incorporates CC-BY-3.0 text from the reference.

Camaenidae
Gastropods described in 1899